Tarik Belmadini (born 17 November 1987 in Viriat) is a French Greco-Roman wrestler. He competed in the Greco-Roman 60 kg event at the 2012 Summer Olympics; after defeating Jarkko Ala-Huikku in the 1/8 finals, he was eliminated by Ryutaro Matsumoto in the quarterfinals. In June 2015, he competed in the inaugural European Games, for France in wrestling, more specifically, Men's Greco-Roman in the 59 kilogram range. He earned a bronze medal. He won bronze medal in 2015 European Games

References

External links
 

1987 births
Living people
Olympic wrestlers of France
Wrestlers at the 2012 Summer Olympics
European Games bronze medalists for France
European Games medalists in wrestling
Wrestlers at the 2015 European Games
French male sport wrestlers
Mediterranean Games silver medalists for France
Mediterranean Games medalists in wrestling
Competitors at the 2013 Mediterranean Games